Mick Gordon may refer to:

 Mick Gordon (director), Northern Irish theater director, playwright, and essayist
 Mick Gordon (composer), Australian composer and sound designer

See also
 Michael Gordon (disambiguation)